Jahar Ganguly (October 1904 – 1969) was an Indian actor and theater personality. He received Best actor award in 6th Annual Bengal Film Journalists' Association Awards in 1943 for his performance in Bandi.

Career
Ganguly was born in undivided 24 Parganas Dist, British India. He worked in number of Bengali and Hindi films in 40s and 50s as a supporting actor in comedy counterparts to the dramatic lead. He got break through in Dena Paona directed by Premankur Atorthy. Ganguly acted under Satyajit Ray's direction in Parash Pathar and Chiriyakhana. He also performed as stage actor until the 1960.

Filmography
 Geeta 
 Tulsidas (1954)
 Manmoyee Girls' School
 Mantra Shakti (1954)
 Sarbajanin Bibahotsab
 Bekar Nashan (1938)
 Ekalavya
 Jakher Dhan (1939)
 Kavi Joydev (1941)
 Bijoyini
 Pratishodh (1941)
 Shri Radha
 Nandini
 Bondi
 Shahar Theke Dooray
 Sahadharmini
 Dwanda (1943)
 Poshya Putra
 Mriter Martye Agaman (1959)
 Nilanguriya
 Rani (1943)
 Dui Purush (1945)
 Priya Bandhabi
 Matir Ghar (1944)
 Path Bendhe Dilo
 Saat Number Kayedi (1953)
 Nader Nimai (1960)
Khokababur Pratyabartan (1960)
 Mane Na Mana
 Kamona (1949)
 Grihalakshmi
 Dui Purush
 Trijama (1956)
 Raj Lakshmi
 Swapna O Sadhana
 Kankantala Light Railway
 Meghmukti
 Saheb Bibi Golam (1956)
 Sitar Patal Prabesh
 Maa-o- Chhele
 Mantra Shakti
 Bhagwan Shri Shri Ramakrishna
 Adarsha Hindu Hotel (film)
 Sagarika
 Mamlar Phal
 Rajpath
 Nabajanma
 Manik (1961)
 Bandhan
 Nirjan Saikate (1963)
 Palatak
 Tridhara
 Uttar Falguni
 Jiban Kahini
 Bireshwar Vivekananda (1964)
 Chupi Chupi Aashey (1960)
 Sudhu Ekti Bachhar
 Chiriyakhana (1967)
 Parash Pathar (1958)
 Charan Kabi Mukundadas
 Hansamithun
 Arogyaniketan
 Jibon Niye

References

External links
 

1904 births
1969 deaths
Male actors in Bengali cinema
Indian male film actors
People from Kolkata
20th-century Indian male actors
Bengali theatre personalities
Male actors from Kolkata
Male actors in Hindi cinema
Indian male stage actors